This is a list of museums in El Salvador.

List
Casa Blanca (El Salvador)
El Museo Aja
Museo de Arte Popular (El Salvador)
Museo de la Ciudad (El Salvador)
Museo de Escultura Enrique Salaverría
Museo de Historia de la Fuerza Armada (El Salvador)
Museo de Joya de Cerén
Museo de la Palabra y la Imagen
Museo de la Revolución (El Salvador)
Museo de la Televisión y el Cine Salvadoreño
Museo de San Andrés
Museo del Ferrocarril de El Salvador
Museo del Tazumal
Museo Regional de Occidente
Museo Regional de Oriente

External links

 http://www.turismo.com.sv/articulos/museos-el-salvador.php

El Salvador
 
Museums
El Salvador
Museums